Caythorpe railway station was a station in Caythorpe, Lincolnshire. Built to serve the nearby village of the same name. It was on the Grantham and Lincoln railway line, between Honington junction and Leadenham, onwards to Navenby, Harmston, Waddington to Lincoln.  The line was owned by the Great Northern Railway. The station closed for passengers in 1962, for goods in 1964 and the line closed in 1965 as part of the Beeching rationalisation of the UK railway system. The site now houses a recycling centre for household waste.

The Great Northern Railway (GNR) was a British railway company established by the Great Northern Railway Act of 1846. On 1 January 1923 the company lost its identity as a constituent of the newly formed London and North Eastern Railway.

The line, opened in 1867, ran through land at Caythorpe owned by GNR chairman George Hussey Packe. Packe's land was the first in south-west Lincolnshire to be mined for iron ore. Opencast workings were either side of the line and used narrow gauge links to rail heads on the line.

References

Disused railway stations in Lincolnshire
Former Great Northern Railway stations
Railway stations in Great Britain opened in 1867
Railway stations in Great Britain closed in 1962